Peblephaeus is a genus of longhorn beetles of the subfamily Lamiinae, containing the following species:

 Peblephaeus decoloratus (Schwarzer, 1925)
 Peblephaeus ishigakianus (Yokoyama, 1971)
 Peblephaeus lutaoensis Takakuwa, 1991
 Peblephaeus nobuoi (Breuning & Ohbayashi, 1966)
 Peblephaeus okinawanus (Hayashi, 1962)
 Peblephaeus satoi Makihara, 2003
 Peblephaeus yayeyamai (Breuning, 1955)

References

Lamiini